Argyropasta is a monotypic moth genus of the family Noctuidae. Its only species, Argyropasta thermopera, is found in the Brazilian state of Santa Catarina. Both the genus and species were first described by George Hampson in 1910.

References

Acontiinae
Monotypic moth genera